Harari is a surname of multiple origins. 

Harari is a Jewish surname that can be translated from Hebrew as 'mountainous' or as 'mountain dweller' (cf. Bergmann).

It is also found among the Harari people from the city of Harar in Ethiopia.

People
 Shamah ben Agee Harari (aka Shammah), one of King David's Warriors (fl. 1010 BCE – 970 BCE)
 Abdullah al-Harari (1906–2008), Ethiopian Harari scholar, founder in Lebanon of the Habashi (Al Ahbash) Order
 Yizhar Harari (1908–1978), Zionist activist and Israeli politician
 Hananiah Harari (1912–2000), American painter and illustrator
 Michael Harari (1927–2014), Israeli intelligence officer

 Haim Harari (1940), Israeli scientist, after whom the Harari Rishon Model is named; President of the Weizmann Institute of Science
 Ilan Harari (1959), former Israeli brigadier general
 Yuval Noah Harari (1976), historian, based at the Hebrew University of Jerusalem
 Jon Harari, CEO of WindowsWear

See also 
 Hariri, Arab surname
 Harari
 Harary, Jewish surname